The Billingane Peaks are a cluster of four peaks, about  east-southeast of See Nunatak at the eastern end of the Hansen Mountains in Antarctica. They were mapped and named by Norwegian cartographers working from air photos taken by the Lars Christensen Expedition, 1936–37.

References 

Mountains of Kemp Land